New York, New York is a board game published in 1989 by F.X. Schmid.

Contents
New York, New York is a game in which players construct the complete New York City skyline using numbered rectangular tiles.

Reception
Brian Walker reviewed New York, New York for Games International magazine, and gave it 4 stars out of 5, and stated that "If you're a card player, buy this game. If you're not a card player, still buy this game. New York, New York. They were right."

References

Board games introduced in 1989